Dagmar Rosenfeld  (born 1974 Cologne) is a German journalist. She has been deputy editor-in-chief of Die Welt since 2016.

Life 
Subsequently, she worked there as an editor in the economic department, then in the political department and was responsible for "page two". In 2009, Rosenfeld moved to the capital office of the time, where she last wrote for the political department.

She is the sister of the writer Astrid Rosenfeld. 
From 2011, she was married to Christian Lindner, then General Secretary and today's chairman of the Free Democratic Party (FDP), with whom she had previously been in a relationship since 2009. The couple separated in 2018.

Reviews 
In late 2017, the self-regulatory body German Press Council issued a disapproval of Die Welt: Deputy editor Dagmar Rosenfeld had published before the federal election 2017 "styling tips for politicians" and advised, among others, the candidate of the FDP, Christian Lindner:
However, since Rosenfeld herself was the wife, the press council attested to "an objective bias on the journalist."

References

External links 
 

1974 births
German journalists
German women journalists
German newspaper journalists
21st-century German journalists
Living people
Writers from Cologne
University of Cologne alumni
Die Welt editors
21st-century German women
German people of Italian descent